Nevado El Fraile also called Incahuasi Chico (the Friar) is a volcanic mountain in the Andes of Chile. It sits at the border of Argentina (Catamarca Province, Fiambala) and Chile (City and Province of Copiapó). Along with numerous other volcanic peaks in the region, including Ojos del Salado, the highest volcano in the world, it is part of the Central Volcanic Zone.

First Ascent 
Fraile was first climbed by Anders Bolinder (Sweden) January 2, 1956.

Elevation 
Other data from available digital elevation models: SRTM yields 6048 metres, ASTER 6024 metres, ALOS 6024 metres and TanDEM-X 6091 metres. The height of the nearest key col is 5260 meters, leading to a topographic prominence of 801 meters. Fraile is considered a Mountain Subgroup according to the Dominance System  and its dominance is 13.22%. Its parent peak is Ojos del Salado and the Topographic isolation is 17.4 kilometers.

External links 

 Elevation information about Fraile
 Weather Forecast at Fraile

References

Mountains of Chile
Six-thousanders of the Andes